Catherine Plewinski (born 12 July 1968 in Courrières, Pas-de-Calais) is a former freestyle and butterfly swimmer from France, who won two bronze medals at the Summer Olympics. She first did so in Seoul at the 1988 Summer Olympics in the 100 m freestyle. Four years later she captured the bronze in the 100 m butterfly at the 1992 Summer Olympics in Barcelona, Spain.

At the 1989 European Aquatics Championships she was the only female swimmer not from East Germany to win gold medals, she won the 50 meter freestyle and the 100 meter butterfly.

See also
 List of Olympic medalists in swimming (women)
 List of World Aquatics Championships medalists in swimming (women)

External links
 
 
 

1968 births
Living people
People from Courrières
French female freestyle swimmers
French female butterfly swimmers
Olympic swimmers of France
Swimmers at the 1988 Summer Olympics
Swimmers at the 1992 Summer Olympics
Olympic bronze medalists for France
Olympic bronze medalists in swimming
World Aquatics Championships medalists in swimming
European Aquatics Championships medalists in swimming
Medalists at the 1992 Summer Olympics
Medalists at the 1988 Summer Olympics
Mediterranean Games gold medalists for France
Swimmers at the 1993 Mediterranean Games
Sportspeople from Pas-de-Calais
Mediterranean Games medalists in swimming
20th-century French people